Long Hollow (historically known as Long Hollow Run) is a tributary of Catawissa Creek in Columbia County, Pennsylvania, in the United States. The stream has a neutral pH and is considered to be a coldwater fishery. The main rock formations in the stream's watershed are the Mauch Chunk Formation, the Spechty Kopf Formation, the Pocono Formation, and the Buddys Run Member of the Catskill Formation.

Course
Long Hollow begins on Catawissa Mountain in Roaring Creek Township. It flows east for a few tenths of a mile. The stream then enters Beaver Township. It continues east and after a sort distance, the stream receives an unnamed tributary. It then continues roughly east for considerably more than a mile in a deep valley. At the end of the valley, the stream reaches its confluence with Catawissa Creek.

Tributaries
Long Hollow has one unnamed tributary. It is known as "Trib 27555 to Long Hollow".

Hydrology
The pH of Long Hollow downstream of "Trib 27555 to Long Hollow" is between 7.0 and 7.5 and the concentration of alkalinity is four milligrams per liter. The pH upstream of this point is unknown. The stream is infertile and acidic, with the potential to be affected by acid precipitation. The total level of water hardness of the stream in milligrams per liter is 4.

The specific conductance of the waters of Long Hollow is 22 umhos.

Geography and geology

The lower reaches of Long Hollow are on rock of the Mauch Chunk Formation and the upper reaches are on rock of the Pocono Formation. The stream's unnamed tributary is on rock of the Spechty Kopf Formation and the Buddys Run Member of the Catskill Formation. The main soils in the watershed are the Leck Kill soil and the Hazleton soil.

The headwaters of Long Hollow are on Catawissa Mountain.

Watershed and history
The majority of the watershed is in  Beaver Township, but a substantial portion is also in Roaring Creek Township. Nearly all of the watershed is forested. However, there are some areas of agricultural land in its lower reaches. The headwaters, upper reaches, and middle reaches of the stream are in the Pennsylvania State Game Lands Number 58. The watershed is in the Shumans United States Geological Survey quadrangle.

Eight percent of the length of Long Hollow is within  of a road. 14 percent is within  of a road and 20 percent is within  of one. In 1990, the population density of the watershed was eight people per square kilometer.

The watershed of Long Hollow is described as "unspoiled" in a 1997 report.

In the early 1900s, the Philadelphia and Reading Railway requested permission to build a concrete arch culvert across Long Hollow. A bridge was also once built across the stream.

A bridge over Long Hollow was swept away during the 1904 Susquehanna River Floods.

Biology
Long Hollow is considered by the Pennsylvania Department of Environmental Protection to be a coldwater fishery. However, a 1997 report suggested upgrading the stream's designation to high-quality coldwater fishery. It is also a Class B wild trout fishery.

Two species of fish inhabit Long Hollow: brook trout and brown trout. Only one brown trout has been observed in the stream. Trout reproduce naturally in the stream between its headwaters and its mouth.

Long Hollow is considered to be a poor site for angling.

See also
Beaver Run (Catawissa Creek), next tributary of Catawissa Creek going downstream
Stranger Hollow, next tributary of Catawissa Creek going upstream
List of tributaries of Catawissa Creek

References

Rivers of Columbia County, Pennsylvania
Tributaries of Catawissa Creek
Rivers of Pennsylvania